Miltochrista karenkonis is a moth of the family Erebidae. It was described by Shōnen Matsumura in 1930. It is found in Taiwan.

Lepidoptera and Some Other Life Forms gives this name as a synonym of Stigmatophora karenkonis (Matsumura, 1930).

References

karenkonis
Moths described in 1930
Moths of Taiwan